Turn Out the Lights is an ITV sitcom series made by Granada Television, that was first broadcast from Monday 2 January to Monday 6 February 1967 by Rediffusion London and Tyne Tees Television, (all other regions broadcast the series between Friday 6 January and Friday 10 February 1967). The series was a spin-off from the sitcom Pardon the Expression, itself a spin-off from the highly popular soap opera Coronation Street.

Synopsis
Leonard Swindley played by Arthur Lowe was the central character, along with Wally Hunt (played by Robert Dorning). Swindley was formerly the manager of the fashion retail store "Gamma Garments" in Coronation Street and the deputy manager of the department store Dobson and Hawks in Pardon the Expression: in this series he becomes a professional speaker on astrology who encounters various supernatural events on his travels around the country, along with his colleague Wally Hunt, after they were both fired from Dobson and Hawks in the final episode of Pardon the Expression.

Production
The series directors were David Boisseau and Michael Cox, production designers were Dennis Parkin and Roy Stonehouse.  The series was not recorded in front of a studio audience and had no laughter-track.

Episode list
The Boyhood Haunt
Hail To Thee, Aunt Shelmadine
A Big Hand For A Little Lady
The Happy Medium
You Can't Get The Wood
One For Yes, Two For No

External links
 
 

1960s British sitcoms
1967 British television series debuts
1967 British television series endings
British supernatural television shows
English-language television shows
ITV sitcoms
Television series by ITV Studios
Television shows produced by Granada Television
British television spin-offs
Coronation Street spin-offs